Acacia merrickiae is a shrub belonging to the genus Acacia and the subgenus Phyllodineae that is endemic to a small area of south western Australia.

Description
It has glabrous branchlets that are covered in a fine white powdery which are roughened by scars of fallen phyllodes. Like most species of Acacia it has phyllodes rather than true leaves. The coriaceous grey-green phyllodes have an elliptic to ovate shape that is commonly shallowly concave and reflexed. It blooms from April to June and produces yellow-cream flowers. Following flowering thinly coriaceous seed pods form that have a linear shape but are constricted between and rounded over each of the seeds.

Taxonomy
The species was first formally described by the botanists Joseph Maiden and William Blakely in 1928 as part of the work Descriptions of fifty new species and six varieties of western and northern Australian Acacias, and notes on four other species as published in the Journal of the Royal Society of Western Australia. It was reclassified by Leslie Pedley in 2003 as Racosperma merrickiae then transferred back to genus Acacia in 2006. A. merrickiae belongs to the Acacia microbotrya group, resembles Acacia leptopetala and is closely related to Acacia meisneri.

Distribution
It is native to an area in the Wheatbelt region of Western Australia in the IBRA Avon Wheatbelt growing in clay, sandy loam and sandy soils. It has a limitied distribution from around Trayning Kellerberrin and Mukinbudin where it is often part of open woodland communities.

See also
List of Acacia species

References

merrickiae
Acacias of Western Australia
Taxa named by Joseph Maiden
Taxa named by William Blakely
Plants described in 1928